The Clearing is an album from drone rock band Locrian. It was originally released on November 1, 2011, through Fan Death Records and later re-released through Relapse Records with an additional album of material titled "The Final Epoch."

The first single off the album, "Chalk Point," was released on October 3, 2011.

Track listing

Personnel
Credits adapted from All Music.

André Foisy – guitar 
Terence Hannum – organ, piano, vocals
Steven Hess – drums, tape

Production
 Jeremy Lemos – engineer, mixing
 Brian Ulrich - artwork
 Jason Ward - Mastering

References

External links 
 

2011 albums
Locrian (band) albums
Relapse Records albums